Benjamin Hallowell  may refer to:

 Benjamin Hallowell Carew (born Benjamin Hallowell), British naval officer of the Napoleonic era
 Benjamin Hallowell Sr (1723–1799), former naval captain, Commissioner of the Board of Customs and father of Benjamin Hallowell Carew.
 Benjamin Hallowell (educator), first president of the Maryland Agricultural College